This is a list of places on land below mean sea level.

Places artificially created such as tunnels, mines, basements, and dug holes, or places under water, or existing temporarily as a result of ebbing of sea tide etc., are not included. Places where seawater and rainwater is pumped away are included. Fully natural places below sea level require a dry climate; otherwise, rain would exceed evaporation and fill the area.

All figures are in meters below mean sea level (as locally defined), arranged by depth, lowest first:

Africa

Antarctica

Asia

Europe

North America

Oceania

South America

Historic and ice-covered areas 
It is subglacial, covered permanently by the largest glacier in the world. Therefore, it is not included in any list on the page. If the ice melted it would be covered by sea.

The biggest dry land area below sea level that has been known to exist during the geological past, as measured by continuous volume of atmospheric air below sea level, was the dry bed of the Mediterranean Sea of the late Miocene period during the Messinian salinity crisis.

See also 
Extreme points of Earth
List of countries by lowest point
List of submarine topographical features

References

External links 
 
 
 

Elevation
Elevation
Elevation
Sea Level